Lynne Willingham is an American television and film editor. She is a two-time Primetime Emmy Award winner.

Life and career
Willingham was born in San Francisco, California to Natalie Chalkley Mirkovich and Joseph M. Mirkovich. She married Chris Willingham, ACE,
in 1988. She attended UCLA. She is a member of American Cinema Editors (ACE). Her recent works are Ray Donovan: The Movie and American Gigolo.

Filmography

Awards and nominations

References

External links
 

Living people
American television editors
Women television editors
American film editors
Year of birth missing (living people)
American women film editors
People from San Francisco
University of California, Los Angeles alumni